Captain is an unincorporated community in western Craig County, Virginia, United States.  It lies at the intersection of Johns Creek Road and Rocky Gap Trail.

References

Unincorporated communities in Craig County, Virginia
Unincorporated communities in Virginia